The Network of Ethiopian Women's Associations is a national network of Ethiopian societies who share the goal of advancing women’s rights, gender equality, and women’s empowerment in Ethiopia.

History 
The Network of Ethiopian Women's Associations states that it was created in 2003 as a network of non-governmental organizations and women's associations in Ethiopia.

After a change in the Charities and Societies law in 2009, NEWA reorganized itself as a consortium of Ethiopian societies working on gender equality and women's rights. NEWA consisted of 42 organizations and associations from around Ethiopia in 2009. NEWA said that it aimed at a "vision of an Ethiopian society where gender equality is realized [and] becomes the normal context for women's and men's lives in Ethiopia".

Area of expertise 
The network aims to ensure that women and men at all levels are made aware of women's constitutional and legal rights, and to solicit practical support from various sectors.

Works 
NEWA recently created a book featuring the stories of 64 of the women interviewed so far, selected to portray a wide range of occupations, ages and backgrounds and for the inspirational quality of their stories.

References 

2003 establishments in Ethiopia
Organizations established in 2003
Women's rights in Ethiopia
Women's rights organizations